Kyle Troy Heffner (born May 21, 1957) is an American television and film actor.

Early life and education
Born in Chicago, Heffner graduated from Northwestern University.

Career 
After graduation, he moved to Los Angeles and met Garry Marshall, who cast him in Young Doctors in Love (1982). Heffner also appeared in the films Flashdance (1983), The Woman in Red (1984), Runaway Train (1985), Spellbinder (1988) and When Harry Met Sally... (1989). Heffner has appeared in numerous television series such as the CBS sitcom Rules of Engagement (2010), as well as television pilots, guest spots, commercials and more films. He played the role of 'shadowy government operative' in the 2014 movie Red Sky.

Personal life 
Heffner resides in Los Angeles with his wife and two children.

Filmography

Film

Television

References

External links

1957 births
Living people
Male actors from Chicago
American male film actors
American male television actors
Northwestern University School of Communication alumni